Törmäsenvaara is a village in the town of Kuusamo in North Ostrobothnia, Finland.

Villages in Finland
Kuusamo